Monica Mohan is an American artist. Her work is included in the collections of the Whitney Museum of American Art and the RISD Museum.

References

Living people
21st-century American artists
21st-century American women artists
Year of birth missing (living people)
Place of birth missing (living people)